This is a list of the butterflies of India belonging to the subfamily Danainae of the family Nymphalidae and an index to the species articles. This forms part of the full List of butterflies of India (Nymphalidae) which itself is part of the complete List of butterflies of India.

A total of 26 species belonging to six genera are found in India.

Parantica, glassy tigers 
 Yellow glassy tiger, Parantica aspasia (Fabricius, 1787)
 Dark glassy tiger, Parantica agleoides (Felder & Felder, 1860)
 Glassy tiger, Parantica aglea (Stoll, 1782)
 Chocolate tiger, Parantica melaneus (Cramer, 1775)
 Chestnut tiger, Parantica sita (Kollar, 1844)
 Nilgiri tiger, Parantica nilgiriensis (Moore, 1877)

Ideopsis, blue glassy tigers
 blue glassy tiger, Ideopsis vulgaris (Butler, 1874)
 Ceylon blue glassy tiger, Ideopsis similis (Linnaeus, 1758)

Tirumala, blue tigers
 Dark blue tiger, Tirumala septentrionis (Butler, 1874)
 Scarce blue tiger, Tirumala gautama (Moore, 1877)
 Blue tiger, Tirumala limniace Cramer, 1775

Danaus, tigers
 Plain tiger, Danaus chrysippus Linnaeus, 1758
 Common or striped tiger, Danaus genutia Cramer, 1779
 White tiger, Danaus melanippus Cramer, 1777
 Malay tiger, Danaus affinis Fabricius, 1775

Euploea, crows
 Striped blue crow, Euploea mulciber (Cramer, 1777)
 Striped black crow, Euploea doubledayi Felder & Felder, 1865
 Spotted black crow, Euploea crameri H. Lucas, 1853
 Common Indian crow, Euploea core (Cramer, 1780)
 Long branded blue crow Euploea algea (Godart, 1819)
 Double-branded crow, Euploea sylvester (Fabricius, 1793)
 Magpie crow, Euploea radamanthus (Fabricius, 1793)
 Blue king crow, Euploea klugii Moore, 1858
 Blue spotted crow, Euploea midamus (Linnaeus, 1758)
 Euploea eunice (Godart, 1819)
 Andaman crow, Euploea andamanensis (Atkinson, 1874)
 Nicobar crow, Euploea scherzeri (Felder, 1862) (includes Euploea climena simulatrix Wood-Mason & de Nicéville, 1881)

Idea, tree nymphs
 Tree nymph, Idea lynceus (Drury, 1773)
 Malabar tree nymph, Idea malabarica Moore, 1877

See also
Nymphalidae
List of butterflies of India
List of butterflies of India (Nymphalidae)

References
 
 
 

Danainae

B